The 103 Squadron of the Israeli Air Force, also known as the Elephants Squadron, is a C-130J Super Hercules squadron based at Nevatim Airbase. The Squadron formerly operated the C-130E and KC-130H models of the Hercules.

References

Israeli Air Force squadrons